is a single by Japanese rock band Sekai no Owari. It was released on January 22, 2014. It debuted in number one on the weekly Oricon Singles Chart and also reached number one on the Billboard Japan Hot 100, where it stayed for two consecutive weeks.

References 

2014 singles
2014 songs
Japanese-language songs
Sekai no Owari songs
Oricon Weekly number-one singles
Billboard Japan Hot 100 number-one singles